The 1920 United States presidential election in Utah took place on November 2, 1920. All contemporary forty-eight states took part as part of the 1920 United States presidential election, and the state voters selected four electors to the Electoral College, who voted for president and vice president. This was the first presidential election to feature as a distinct voting unit Daggett County, the newest and least populous of Utah's current twenty-nine counties.

In 1916, Utah had turned strongly Democratic as a result of a powerful "peace vote" for incumbent President Woodrow Wilson; however, by the beginning of 1920 skyrocketing inflation and Wilson's focus upon his proposed League of Nations at the expense of domestic policy had helped make the incumbent President very unpopular – besides which Wilson also had major health problems that had left First Lady Edith effectively running the nation. Political unrest seen in the Palmer Raids and the "Red Scare" further added to the unpopularity of the Democratic Party, since this global political turmoil produced considerable fear of alien revolutionaries invading the country. Demand in the West for exclusion of Asian immigrants became even stronger than it had been before.

All these factors combined to produce a national landslide, with a swing of almost twenty-nine percentage points to the Republicans vis-à-vis the election of 1916. Utah followed the national trend closely: whereas Wilson had won the state by twenty percentage points in 1916 and had clean-swept the twenty-eight extant counties, in 1920 Harding by campaigning on a "return to normalcy" carried every county in the Beehive State with a swing of thirty-seven percentage points. This was the first time Washington County had ever been carried by the Republican nominee. Despite this large swing, Utah in 1920 still voted 9.08 percentage points more Democratic than the nation at-large.

On the ballot in Utah in 1920 in addition to the two major party candidates were Utah native Parley P. Christensen of the "Farmer-Labor" Party, and imprisoned Socialist candidate Eugene Debs in his fifth and final run for president. Christensen was supported by some unionists and veterans of Theodore Roosevelt's 1912 presidential campaign. Despite the endorsement of Herbert Croly, Christensen received only one percent of the nationwide vote, and although he finished ahead of Cox in numerous counties in Washington State and South Dakota, Parley could only obtain three percent in his home state, whilst Debs accomplished even less.

Results

Results by county

See also
 United States presidential elections in Utah

Notes

References

1920 Utah elections
Utah
1920